The teams competing in Group 4 of the 2015 UEFA European Under-21 Championships qualifying competition were Spain, Austria, Hungary, Bosnia and Herzegovina and Albania.

The ten group winners and the four best second-placed teams advanced to the play-offs.

Standings

Results and fixtures
All times are CEST (UTC+02:00) during summer and CET (UTC+01:00) during winter.

Goalscorers
8 goals
  Álvaro Morata

4 goals
  Iker Muniain

3 goals

  Kevin Stöger
  Robert Žulj

2 goals

  Herolind Shala
  Vasil Shkurti
  Michael Gregoritsch
  Louis Schaub
  Mario Kvesić
  Jasmin Mešanović
  Sanjin Prcić
  Krisztián Adorján
  Dávid Holman
  Gerard Deulofeu
  Jesé
  Óliver
  Saúl

1 goal

  Enis Gavazaj
  Fabio Hoxha
  Gjelbrim Taipi
  Marco Djuricin
  Kevin Friesenbichler
  Florian Kainz
  Daniel Offenbacher
  Aldin Čajić
  Haris Duljević
  Srđan Grahovac
  Nermin Zolotić
  Patrik Bacsa
  Botond Baráth
  Barnabás Bese
  László Kleinheisler
  András Radó
  Bálint Vécsei
  József Windecker
  Dani Carvajal
  Sergi Roberto
  Pablo Sarabia

1 own goal

  Tomislav Barišić (against Spain)
  Dani Carvajal (against Austria)

References

External links
Standings and fixtures at UEFA.com

Group 4